Salem's Lot is a 2004 American two-part television miniseries which first aired on TNT on June 20 and ended its run on June 21, 2004. It is the second television adaptation of Stephen King's 1975 vampire novel 'Salem's Lot following the 1979 miniseries adaptation.

Although the novel and original miniseries were both set in the 1970s, this version updates the story to take place in the 2000s. The story is still set in a small Maine town, but the miniseries was actually shot on location at Creswick and Woodend, in Central Victoria, Australia.

Plot 
Ben Mears attacks priest Donald Callahan in a homeless shelter in Detroit on Thanksgiving. As they corner each other in Callahan's office, the priest shoots Mears, who then shoves them both out a window onto the street (more specifically, onto a police car). In the hospital where he and Callahan are taken, Ben is asked by an orderly why, as a Christian himself, he shouldn't just let Ben die for attacking a priest. Ben then murmurs, "Jerusalem's Lot," and begins to tell his story.

On the day of February 6 two years ago, Ben, then a successful writer, returns to his hometown, Jerusalem's Lot (also known as "Salem's Lot" to the locals) in Maine, intending to write a novel. He tells Susan Norton, a waitress and former art student, that when he was a child he accepted a dare to enter the house of Hubie Marsten, a Prohibition-era gangster. Local legend said that Marsten murdered children. Ben overheard Marsten begging for his life before seemingly committing suicide. Ben believes he heard Marsten's last victim crying for help, but Ben was too afraid to find or help him. Eventually, his aunt found him. Ben plans to rent the house to bring catharsis to himself and gather material for his novel, but discovers it has been sold by Larry Crockett to antique dealers Richard Straker and Kurt Barlow.

Despite the picture perfect façade of the small town, Salem's Lot is rife with dark secrets: Crockett is an immoral businessman who sexually abuses his teenage daughter Ruth. When Ruth spends time with a disabled garbageman named Dud Rodgers, Crockett gets him fired. Eva Prunier, proprietor of the boarding house where Ben stays, played evil games with Marsten when she and her peers were teenagers. Charlie Rhodes, cruelty-obsessed Vietnam veteran and school bus driver, torments the children he transports. Trailer park residents Roy and Sandy McDougall physically abuse their baby, blackmailing Dr. Jimmy Cody after he has an affair with Sandy.

Following Straker and Barlow's arrival, local child Ralphie Glick is murdered and his body is never found. His brother Danny sickens and dies after being visited by Ralphie, who has become a vampire. Barlow meets Dud Rodgers, offering him a chance to be free of his physical disability, which he accepts, becoming a vampire. Laborer Mike Ryerson buries Danny after his funeral, then also sickens and dies. He returns from the grave as a vampire to tempt gay high school teacher Matt Burke, who repels him but suffers a heart attack. Ben's blossoming relationship with Susan causes jealousy with her old boyfriend Floyd Tibbits. Floyd is bitten by Dud and slowly becomes a vampire. After starting a fight with Ben, Floyd and Ben spend the night in jail, and Floyd uses his vampire powers to crawl through the ventilation shaft to taunt Ben. Ben refuses to allow him to enter his cell, and Floyd is found dead in his own cell the following morning, having chewed open his wrists in an attempt to drink his own blood.

Susan and schoolboy Mark Petrie are captured by Straker when they break into the Marsten house. Mark escapes, but Susan is taken to the cellar to meet Barlow. Ben, Mark, Callahan and Cody begin acting as vampire hunters. In the Marsten house, they find Straker's body hanging from the rafters, having been drained of blood by Barlow. They begin destroying the sleeping vampires in the cellar, but Ben discovers Susan has been turned. Instead of destroying her, Ben intends to find and destroy Barlow, hopeful Susan might be restored upon his destruction.

After Barlow kills Mark's mother, Callahan tries saving Mark by confronting Barlow, but finds his religious faith is not strong enough. Callahan is forced to drink Barlow's blood, corrupting Callahan and turning him into Barlow's servant. Larry sees Ruth join Dud in the night, and despite his wish to be with her, is consumed by the vampires. The town's ranking police officer, Sheriff Parkins Gillespie, discovers what is going on in Salem's Lot and decides to leave.

In the hospital, Burke is murdered by Callahan. Ben, Jimmy and Mark realize Barlow is hiding at Eva's boarding house, but as they arrive there, Jimmy is killed by a booby trap. Ben and Mark destroy Barlow, but not before he taunts Ben, likening Ben to himself as another parasite who preys on the tragedies of others. Destroying Barlow has not saved Susan, who arrives at the house. Susan tells Ben that the boy he failed to rescue was already dead; Ben was never to blame. When Susan turns to attack Mark, Ben destroys her. Ben and Mark set the Marsten House alight, and during a chase with Charlie, who was vampirized by the town's children, a gas station is damaged and explodes. As fires spread through the town, Callahan vows revenge against Ben while the town's remaining vampirized population flock to him.

As Ben concludes his story, the orderly realizes Ben was not acting alone. The orderly finds Callahan dead, suffocated with a pillow by Mark. Mark slips into Ben's room and tells him the vampire hunt is over. Ben suffers a cardiac arrest. The orderly finds Mark at a locked exit to the hospital and tells Mark he can't believe the story, but lets him go, indicating he may be struggling with actually believing it. Doctors battle to keep Ben alive as he begins passing away, finally at peace.

Cast

Main cast

Supporting cast

Production
In his memoir, Love Life, Rob Lowe stated that Rutger Hauer showed up on set and did not know his lines. Lowe said, "I once starred in a big miniseries that culminated with the villain giving a two-page monologue trying to goad me into killing him. The actor playing the bad guy wanted to ad lib his own version of the movie-ending speech. Although he was playing a vampire, he went into a soliloquy about being a cowboy. The director was not impressed. After a very tense negotiation, the actor was forced to shit-can his self-penned opus and stick to the original script. There was only one problem: He hadn't bothered to learn it." Lowe went on to state that cue cards were placed next to his head and Hauer read the lines to him.

Reception

Critical response
Review aggregator Rotten Tomatoes gives the miniseries a 68% approval rating based on 25 reviews, with an average rating of 5.6/10. The website's critics consensus reads, "Salem's Lot is a bit anemic due to a dearth of proper scares, but its effectively creepy atmosphere and solid performances make for a respectable adaptation of Stephen King's revered novel." On Metacritic, the miniseries has a score of 65 out of 100, based on 17 critics, indicating "Generally favorable reviews"

Accolades

See also
 Vampire film
 List of vampire television series

References

External links
 
 
 Official Website

'Salem's Lot
2004 television films
2004 films
Vampires in television
Films set in Maine
TNT Network original films
American horror television films
2000s American television miniseries
Television shows based on American novels
Television shows based on works by Stephen King
Films based on American horror novels
Films directed by Mikael Salomon
Television series by The Wolper Organization
Television series by Warner Bros. Television Studios
American vampire films
2000s American films